Marie Griesbach (after 1920 Hundt) (26 November 1896, Dresden – 13 March 1984,  Ohlenstedt) was a German revolutionary, anthroposophist and writer. She was named Red Marie by Heinrich Vogeler.

During the German Revolution of November 1919 she joined the International Communists of Germany and took legal responsibility for the contents of their newsletter Der Kommunist.

References

1896 births
1983 deaths
20th-century German women writers
Anthroposophists
German communists
German revolutionaries
People of the German Revolution of 1918–1919